Gilles Jérôme Moehrle MBE (born 28 September 1964), better known as Gilles Peterson, is a French broadcaster, DJ, and record label owner. He founded the influential labels Acid Jazz and Talkin' Loud, and started his current label Brownswood Recordings in 2006. He was awarded an honorary MBE in 2004, the AIM Award for Indie Champion and the Mixmag Award for Outstanding Contribution To Dance Music in 2013, the PRS for Music Award for Outstanding Contribution to Music Radio in 2014, and The A&R Award from the Music Producers Guild in 2019.

Throughout his career, Peterson has played a pivotal role in promoting genres such as jazz, hip-hop, and electronic music. He started his career on pirate radio stations Radio Invicta and K-Jazz, later joining legal stations in London, first the newly founded Jazz FM, and then onto the dance music station Kiss FM. In 1998, he was hired by BBC Radio 1, and in 2012 he began hosting a three-hour Saturday afternoon programme on BBC Radio 6 Music. He hosts a syndicated radio programme that is broadcast in seven European countries.

In 2016, he launched the online radio station Worldwide FM with Boiler Room co-founder and original host Thristian Richards. He also hosts mixes and new music on his SoundCloud page, where he has over three million followers. He is behind several events celebrating the music that he supports through his DJ sets and radio shows. Since 2005, he has hosted the annual Worldwide Awards in London and Worldwide Festival in Sète. In 2019, launched the new We Out Here festival in the UK.

Career

Radio 
Peterson was first heard as a DJ on the London pirate radio station Radio Invicta, Peterson spent his teenage years putting up radio transmitters for the pirates and playing on stations such as K-Jazz. Brought up in Suburban South London soul scene Peterson was exposed to a variety of music. He went on to host Mad on Jazz on BBC Radio London in 1986–87, and became known on the London circuit as a DJ specialising in the new breed of "acid jazz", drawing on the jazz, funk, Latin fusions and Brazilian music of the 1970s.

In March 1990, Peterson joined London's first-ever dedicated jazz station 102.2 Jazz FM at its launch. The three-hour show was stripped into sections including the "Samba 60" and the "Vibrazone". Artists as diverse as the Freestyle Fellowship, Sérgio Mendes and Leon Thomas would all appear on the same playlist. He was dismissed from the station after playing anti-war songs and making anti-war comments during the first Gulf War.

Peterson would then join Kiss FM in 1991, the station having become legal the year before. In his "Vibrazone" shows on Kiss FM he played acts as diverse as Josh Wink, Gang Starr and Horace Silver in the space of a single programme. Features included the "Herbie Sessions".

From 1998 to 2012, through his BBC show Worldwide – which was originally produced by longtime collaborator Benji B, Karen P (Folded Wing), Ben Cave, Beccy Grierson, Alex Kenning, and Dave O'Donnell – Peterson continued to present a wide range of music that may be new to its young audiences. The show always presented a combination of new, older and often very rare records from the late 1950s to 1980s. Every three months or so, Peterson dedicated a whole show to older vinyl releases in a special version of his show he subtitled as Brownswood Basement; two associated compilation albums with the same name containing older personal classics have been released on the United States label Ubiquity Records's offshoot Luv N' Haight.

In August 2004, the show moved from Wednesday (midnight till 2 am) to an earlier Sunday slot (11 pm to 1 am), with a spectacular live outside broadcast from The Big Chill at Eastnor Castle Herefordshire, featuring Bugz In The Attic performing a DJ set, and interviews with house DJ Tom Middleton and Mr. Scruff. One of the highlights of the changed format BBC Radio 1 show was the special sessions from the BBC's Maida Vale Studios. These included artists such as Roots Manuva, Björk and Floating Points. In September 2006, the show was moved from Sunday night to Tuesday night/Wednesday morning between 2 am and 4 am. The first show included a live appearance from Lupe Fiasco.

In late 2011, Peterson announced that after 13 years at the station he would be leaving BBC Radio 1, following his last show in the early hours of Wednesday 28 March and moving to a new show on BBC Radio 6 Music. Peterson started a new three-hour Saturday afternoon show on BBC Radio 6 Music, beginning on Saturday 7 April 2012, running weekly from 3 to 6 pm, and giving him an extra hour of broadcast time. Like his previous Radio 1 programme, it is made by independent production company Somethin' Else for the BBC. He also presents a weekly show on RTÉ 2XM, 2-4pm on Mondays.

A new global music-radio platform named Worldwide FM was launched by Gilles Peterson in 2016 with Boiler Room co-founder Thristian Richards in September 2016. Following the success of the Grand Theft Auto V in-game radio station of the same name, WorldWide FM has expanded into the real world with Peterson and Richards hosting shows alongside a hand-picked roster of the finest DJs and selectors from five continents. Since the launch, the station has gone out on the road broadcasting across Europe, the US and Asia, with pop-ups in Amsterdam (ADE), Los Angeles (How We Do LA), Marseille (Le Gallette), Milan (Jazzmi Festival), Paris (Le Mellotron), Tokyo (HMV Shibuya), and closer to home, at the 1:54 Contemporary African Art Fair (Somerset House). The station is Powered by WeTransfer and broadcasting from The Pyramid radio studios in north London.

Record labels and clubs 
Upon leaving BBC London in 1987, Peterson took up a new Sunday afternoon residency at Dingwalls in Camden. It was around the same time that he'd started BGP Records, a sub-label of Ace Records focused on soul, funk and jazz dance, together with DJ Baz Fe Jazz. Playing alongside fellow London DJ Patrick Forge, the night, dubbed Talkin' Loud And Sayin' Something, ran for five years. It coincided with the rise of acid house in UK clubland and would grow to establish itself as a legendary session. The sessions were characterised by jazz dancers in suits, hats and spats, well-known jazz dance classics including tracks from Yusef Lateef, Pharoah Sanders, Freddie Hubbard, Airto, Herbie Hancock, and the anthemic In The Fast Lane by Jean-Luc Ponty; but the jazz was fused with hip-hop and the more experimental tracks. It was at a Special Branch show, with fellow DJ Chris Bangs, that the term "acid jazz" was coined, starting as an in-joke. At the time, acid house was in the ascendant, and at one of the shows Bangs played a rare groove record, grabbed the mic and shouted: "Fuck that, if that was acid house, this is acid jazz!”. In 1988, Peterson and Eddie Piller founded Acid Jazz Records, a label whose roster included the Brand New Heavies, Jamiroquai, Corduroy, the James Taylor Quartet and Snowboy.

In 1990, Peterson founded record label Talkin' Loud, enlisting the help of fellow DJ Norman Jay, who formed his own Global Village label. The Talkin' Loud roster included Nuyorican Soul (a side project of the producers Masters At Work), Courtney Pine, MJ Cole, Young Disciples, Incognito, Terry Callier, The Roots, Galliano and Roni Size's project Reprazent. The first release from Talkin' Loud was a self-titled compilation in 1990 featuring artists Galliano, Jalal of the Last Poets, Incognito, Young Disciples, Wild & Peaceful, and Ace of Clubs. The label saw five of its artists nominated for the Mercury Music Prize, with Roni Size's Reprazent winning the award in 1997 for the album New Forms. The iconic Talkin' Loud logo was created by Ian Swift (Swifty) who also designed the magazine Straight No Chaser.

Peterson's current record label, Brownswood Recordings, was launched in 2006. The label's early releases includes the likes of British singer/songwriter Ben Westbeech, 45-piece orchestral ensemble The Heritage Orchestra, Japanese punk jazz band Soil & "Pimp" Sessions, Brooklyn-based pianist Elan Mehler and jazz vocalist José James. More recently, they've released music by Zara McFarlane, Ghostpoet's Mercury Prize-nominated debut and their long-running compilation series, compiled by Peterson, called Brownswood Bubblers. On 8 October 2006, both Peterson and Forge played the first of many annual reunion shows at the old site of Dingwalls (now a Jongleurs comedy club), with a compilation album of popular tracks from the club also being released at the same time in 2006 entitled Sunday Afternoon at Dingwalls. This was just one among many other significant clubs with which Peterson was associated: Special Branch, Electric Ballroom, Wag Club, Babylon at Heaven, Fez, Talkin Loud at the Fridge, That's How It Is at Bar Rumba and his long association with Plastic People.

2009 saw the birth of a new collaborative project and long-term partnership between Peterson and Havana Club's "Havana Cultura", a global initiative developed by Havana Club International that gives a platform to Cuban artists from all disciplines. Peterson and Brownswood's involvement began two years later, resulting in four album releases and three international tours. Havana Cultura: New Cuba Sound was the first album to come out of the project, released in 2010. Travelling to Cuba in 2009, Peterson teamed up with the award-winning Cuban jazz pianist Roberto Fonseca to find the best up-and-coming musical talent in Havana. The double CD album was a celebration of Cuba's musical forces spanning Latin, Afro jazz and fusion to hip-hop, funk, reggaeton and soul. In support of this project, Peterson began a European tour in June/July 2010, accompanied by Fonseca, his band and vocalists Danay Suarez, Ogguere and Obsesión. This was the first of three tours organised in close collaboration with Havana Club. The Gilles Peterson Havana Cultura Band has now travelled through Europe and beyond with shows in London (Barbican), Paris, Amsterdam, Istanbul, Berlin and Madrid, as well as many festivals. Travelling with the rest of the 2011 crew, Mala (Digital Mystikz) was also invited to Cuba with Peterson to record and collaborate with local musicians as part of the ongoing Havana Cultura project. The results are found on the album Mala in Cuba, which was released on Brownswood Recordings in partnership with Havana Cultura on 10 September 2012.

Released in May 2014, the Sonzeira Brasil Bam Bam Bam album saw the Talkin' Loud imprint revived in partnership with Virgin EMI. The record is a journey through the different flavours of authentic Brazilian music culture. Sonzeira is the collective name for the group of Brazilian artists who feature on the album. Peterson turned from DJ to producer for this ambitious venture, settling in Rio de Janeiro with young UK production associates Sam Shepherd (Floating Points); Dilip Harris and Rob Gallagher from 2 Banks of 4; and Kassin from Rio collective Orquestra Imperial. The album features Brazilian artists such as Seu Jorge and Elza Soares. Along with the album, there was a documentary film celebrating the creation and release of "Sonzeira: Brasil Bam Bam Bam". Titled "Bam Bam Bam: The Story of Sonzeira", this two-hour documentary was directed by Charlie Inman and Ben Holman and shot in 2014 by Mother London and Rio de Janeiro's Beija Films. The film was also distributed in Tokyo, Japan by Sha-la-la Company and raised money for Fight For Peace (Luta Pela Paz), organisation founded in Complexo da Maré, Rio de Janeiro, as a direct response to youth-involvement in drug-related crime and violence.

Festivals

In 2006, Peterson worked with Freshly Cut, a French event production company from Montpellier, to create the Worldwide Festival, a small intimate festival during the summertime in the coastal town of Sète in France. It celebrated its tenth edition in 2015. It was later expanded to include a winter version which is now hosted in Leysin in the Swiss Alps.

In 2019, Peterson, as part of Brownswood Recordings, helped found a new festival We Out Here. Taking place in Cambridgeshire, the festival celebrates the 'elements and community of UK club culture.'

The Worldwide Awards is an annual event wherein Gilles Peterson chooses his favourite records of the year. His listeners then vote for the top 10 via the Radio 1 website. The event has been held at London venues including Cargo and KoKo with full broadcast coverage by Radio 1, and has expanded to include sections such as "Best Clubnight", "Best Record Shop", "Best Compilation Album", and a special award called "The John Peel'Play More Jazz' Award" given to an artist, often a newcomer, who has displayed special noteworthy work over the year.

Peterson has made many regular appearances at music festivals across the world including Lovebox in east London, The Big Chill in Hereford and the Southport Weekender in the north west of England. Away from the UK he has appeared at the Exit Festival in Serbia, INmusic festival in Croatia, and in 2006 the Coachella Valley Music and Arts Festival. Peterson also curated his own stage at Montreux Jazz Festival for 10 years during the 1990s. Recently he has appeared in festivals such as Tramlines, Standon Calling, Dimensions Festival in Croatia, Summerstage, Slide Festival and Odyssia Festival, where he gave a spontaneous interview sharing some interesting thoughts about music and festivals.

Steve Reid Foundation

In 2011, Peterson founded the Steve Reid Foundation in memory of the legendary jazz drummer. Having witnessed Reid's suffering with illness and hardship, Gilles set up the charity to raise money for musicians in need. Since then, they've collaborated with Help Musicians UK to help musicians who are in need of support. More recently, a collaboration with the PRS Foundation has seen grants and mentoring provided to new artists. Gilles ran the 2011 London Marathon, raising just under £7,000 for Help Musicians UK, followed by the 2016 New York Marathon, where he raised over $21,000 for the Steve Reid Foundation.

Personal life 
Peterson was born in Caen, Normandy, France to a French mother and Swiss father and moved with his family to South London during childhood. He is a French citizen and does not hold dual citizenship with Britain.

As of 2018, Peterson lives in Stoke Newington in North London with his wife Atsuko and two sons, Olivier and Luc.

Awards
 Sony Gold Award – Best Specialist Music Radio Show (2000)
 Outstanding Contribution To Dance Music (2011)
 University of Nottingham – Honorary master's degree 
 AIM Independent Music Awards – Indie Champion (2013)
 Mixmag – Outstanding Contribution To Dance Music (2013)
 Mixcloud – Best World Music Radio Show (2014)
 Jazz FM –  Digital Initiative of the Year Award (2017) (awarded to Worldwide FM)
 Music Producers Guild – The A&R Award (2019)

Discography

Compilations 

 Jazz Juice Street Sounds 1985
 Jazz Juice 2 Street Sounds 1985
 Jazz Juice 3 Street Sounds 1986
 Jazz Juice 4 Street Sounds 1986
 Baptist Beat Blue Note 1987
 Cal's Pals BGP Records 1987
 Jazz Juice 5 Street Sounds 1987
 Jazz Juice 6 Street Sounds 1987
 Focus on Fusion BGP Records 1987
 Focus on Fusion Volume 2 BGP Records 1987
 Acid Inc., The Best of Funk Inc.                   BGP Records 1988
 Acid Jazz And Other Illicit Grooves Polydor (Germany) 1988
 B&G Party BGP Records 1988
 Beat On (The Best of the Blackbyrds) BGP Records 1988
 Dance Juice Vol. 2 BGP Records 1988
 Dance Juice Vol. 3 BGP Records 1988
 Jazz Juice 7 Street Sounds 1988
 Jazz Juice 8 Street Sounds 1988
 Milestone Memories BGP Records 1988
 The Best of Azymuth BGP Records 1988
 Acid Jazz Vol. 4 BGP Records 1989
 Jazz Today Volume 1 BGP Records 1989
 Latin Jazz – Volume 1 BGP Records 1989
 Latin Jazz – Volume 2 BGP Records 1989
 Soul Jazz Volume 1 BGP Records 1989
 The Best of Acid Jazz BGP Records 1989
 Totally Wired Acid Jazz 1989
 Totally Wired II Acid Jazz 1989
 Acid Jazz Vol. 1 BGP Records 1991
 Acid Jazz Vol. 2 BGP Records 1991
 Acid Jazz Vol. 3 BGP Records 1991
 Acid Inc., The Best of Funk Inc.                   BGP Records 1991
 Make It Deep And Phunky Blue Note 1992
 The Best of Latin Jazz BGP Records 1992
 Mo' Deep Mo' Phunky Blue Note 1993
 Brasil – Escola Do Jazz Toshiba EMI Ltd 1994
 Brazilica!                                   Talkin' Loud 1994
 Jazz Juice #1 Beechwood Music, Street Sounds 1994
 Jazz Juice #2 Beechwood Music, Street Sounds 1994
 Talkin' Jazz: Themes From The Black Forest Talkin' Loud 1994
 Talkin' Jazz Volume 2 (More Themes From The Black Forest) Talkin' Loud, Polydor (Germany) 1994
 Jazz Juice #3 Beechwood Music, Street Sounds 1995
 Talkin' Verve Verve Records 1995
 Brazilica, Volume II Talkin' Loud 1997
 Desert Island Mix Journeys By DJ 1997
 Talkin' Jazz Vol [III] Talkin' Loud 1997
 Talkin' Louder Year on Year Talkin' Loud, DJ Magazine 1997
 Free Style Mercury 1998
 INCredible Sound of Gilles Peterson INCredible 1999
 Sound of the City Vol. 2 – London Motor Music, Universal Jazz (Germany) 1999
 Worldwide Programme 1 Talkin' Loud 2000
 GP01 Trust The DJ 2001
 GP02 – Eclectic Trust The DJ 2002
 GP03 Trust The DJ 2002
 Impressed With Gilles Peterson Universal Jazz (UK) 2002
 Worldwide 2 Programme 2 Talkin' Loud 2002
 A Journey to the Dawn Temposphere 2003
 Broken Folk Funk Latin Soul Muzik Magazine 2003
 GP04 – Eclectic Trust The DJ 2003
 GP05 – Eclectic Session Vol. 2 Trust The DJ 2003
 Shibuya Jazz Classics – Gilles Peterson Collection – TRIO Issue Solid Records 2003
 Southport Weekender suSU 2003
 Worldwide 3 Programme 3 Talkin' Loud 2003
 Gilles Peterson in Brazil Ether 2004
 Impressed 2 With Gilles Peterson Universal Jazz (UK) 2004
 Worldwide Exclusives Talkin' Loud 2004
 Brasil – The Rhythm And Art of Movement Nike 2005
 Gilles Peterson Digs America – Brownswood U.S.A.              Luv N' Haight 2005
 Gilles Peterson in Africa Ether 2005
 Gilles Peterson Presents – The BBC Sessions Vol. 1 Ether 2005
 Petit Dejeuner Au Lit!                       Most Records, Habitat 2005
 Smell The Grass Mixmag 2005
 Brownswood Bubblers Brownswood Recordings 2006
 Gilles Peterson & Patrick Forge Present – Sunday Afternoon at Dingwalls Ether 2006
 Gilles Peterson Back in Brazil Ether 2006
 Pure Fire! A Gilles Peterson Impulse! Collection Impulse!                  2006
 The Kings of Jazz – Compiled by Gilles Peterson and Jazzanova Rapster Records 2006
 Brownswood Bubblers Two Brownswood Recordings 2007
 Fania DJ Series Gilles Peterson Fania Records 2007
 Gilles Peterson Digs America 2 – Searching at the End of an Era Luv N' Haight 2007
 Brownswood Bubblers Three Brownswood Recordings 2008
 Gilles Peterson in the House ITH Records 2008
 Brazilika Far Out Recordings 2009
 Brownswood Bubblers Four Brownswood Recordings 2009
 Freedom Rhythm & Sound – Revolutionary Jazz & The Civil Rights Movement 1963–82 Soul Jazz Records 2009
 Gilles Peterson Presents Havana Cultura: New Cuba Sound Brownswood Recordings 2009
 Brownswood Bubblers Five Brownswood Recordings 2010
 Brownswood Bubblers Six Brownswood Recordings 2010
 Everyday Blue Note – Compiled by Gilles Peterson Blue Note (Japan Only) 2010
 Gilles Peterson Presents Havana Cultura: Remixed Brownswood Recordings 2010
 Gilles Peterson Presents: Worldwide BBE 2010
 Heartbeat Presents One Time! Mixed by Gilles Peterson × Air Lastrum 2010
 Horo: A Jazz Portrait Dejavu 2010
 Bossa Nova and the Rise of Brazilian Music in the 1960s Soul Jazz Records 2011
 Brownswood Bubblers Seven Brownswood Recordings 2011
 Gilles Peterson Presents Havana Cultura: The Search Continues Brownswood Recordings 2011
 Masterpiece: Created By Gilles Peterson Ministry of Sound 2011
 Brownswood Bubblers Eight Brownswood Recordings 2012
 Black Jazz Radio Snow Dog (Japan Only) 2012
 Brownswood Bubblers Nine Brownswood Recordings 2012
 Brownswood One Hundred Remixed Brownswood Recordings 2013
 Brownswood Bubblers Ten Brownswood Recordings 2013
 Brownswood Bubblers Eleven Brownswood Recordings 2014
 Brunswick Bubblers Ultra-Vybe, Inc. 2014
 Gilles Peterson Presents Sonzeira Talkin' Loud / Virgin EMI 2014

Remixes 
Selected credits

 Gregory Porter – "Liquid Spirit - Patchwork Peterson Remix" from The Remix EP (with Alex Patchwork)
Melanie De Biasio – No Deal Remixed (album contributor)
 Raphael Gualazzi – "Reality & Fantasy (Gilles Peterson Remix)"
 Nono Morales – "Saona" (Gilles P & Simbad Remix)
 Bukky Leo & Black Egypt – "Skeleton (Gilles P Winter Dub)"
 Chambao – "Duende Del Sur (Gilles Peterson Dub)"
 Ghostpoet – Survive It (Gilles Peterson Mix)
 Keziah Jones – "Lagos – NY (Gilles Peterson Remix)"
 Seu Jorge – "Burguesinha (Gilles P Re-Edit)"
 Tito Puente – "Watu Wasuri (Gilles P Re-Edit)"
 Louie Vega – "One Dream (Gilles Peterson Edit)"
 Laura Welsh – "Undiscovered (Gilles Peterson Remix)"
 Meshell N'Degeocello – "Friends (Gilles P & Simbad Remix)"
 Makaya McCraven – "Run 'Dem (Gilles Peterson Edit)"

Other credits 
 Roberto Fonseca – Yo (co-produced tracks)
 Omar Souleyman – "Tawwalt El Gheba" (producer)
Danay Suarez – Havana Cultura Sessions (Executive producer)

Bibliography 
Compilations edited with Stuart Baker
Bossa Nova and the Rise Of Brazilian Music in the 1960s. London: Soul Jazz Books, 2011.
 Freedom Rhythm & Sound: Revolutionary Jazz Original Cover Art 1965–83 . London: Soul Jazz Books, 2017.
Cuba: Music and Revolution: Original Album Cover Art of Cuban Music: The Record Sleeve Designs of Revolutionary Cuba 1960–85. London: Soul Jazz Books, 2021.

References

External links
  – official site
 Gilles Peterson (BBC Radio 6 Music)
 Gilles Peterson (BBC Radio 1) (archive)
 

1964 births
Living people
Musicians from Caen
English DJs
English radio DJs
British music industry executives
English people of French descent
English people of Swiss descent
BBC Radio 6 Music presenters
Record collectors
Brownswood Recordings
Talkin' Loud artists
French DJs
French music industry executives
French emigrants to England